Go Tell It on the Mountain is a 1985 American made-for-television drama film directed by Stan Lathan, based on James Baldwin's 1953 novel of the same name. It stars Paul Winfield, Rosalind Cash, Ruby Dee, Alfre Woodard, Douglas Turner Ward, CCH Pounder, Kadeem Hardison, Giancarlo Esposito, and Ving Rhames in his first film role. The film was initially broadcast on the PBS television program American Playhouse on January 14, 1985.

Plot

This film adaptation of James Baldwin’s celebrated novel tells the journey of a family from the rural South to “big city” Harlem seeking both salvation and understanding and of a young boy struggling to earn the approval of a self-righteous and often unloving stepfather.

Cast
Paul Winfield as Gabriel Grimes
Rosalind Cash as Aunt Florence
Giancarlo Esposito as Elisha
Douglas Turner Ward as Reverend James
Ruby Dee as Mrs. Grimes
Ving Rhames as Young Gabriel
CCH Pounder as Deborah
Alfre Woodard as Esther
Kadeem Hardison as Royal
James Bond III as John
Olivia Cole as Elizabeth

References

External links
 
 
 

1985 television films
1985 films
1985 drama films
African-American films
Films based on works by James Baldwin
Films directed by Stan Lathan
Television shows based on American novels
American Playhouse
American drama television films
1980s English-language films
1980s American films